Biokovsko Selo is a village in the Zagvozd municipality of Split-Dalmatia County, Croatia. Its population was 55 in 2011.

References 

Populated places in Split-Dalmatia County
Zagvozd